Building blocks for tropical rainforest conservation include ecotourism and rehabilitation. Reforestation and restoration are common practices in certain areas to try to increase tropical rainforest density. By communicating with the local people living in, and around, the rainforest, conservationists can learn more about what might allow them to best focus their efforts.
Rainforests are globally important to sustainability and preservation of biodiversity. Although they may vary in location and inhabited species of plants and animals, they remain important worldwide for their abundance of natural resources and for the ecosystem services. It is important to take into consideration the differing species and the biodiversity that exists across different rainforest types in order to accurately implement methods of conservation.

Ecotourism 
Ecotourism is conducting tours of a specific area in efforts to teach the public about often threatened environments. It is a practice that represents one imperative solution to saving endangered habitat. Tourists and tour guides alike often make generous donations to conservation efforts in the regions they visit, greatly helping the preservation of the Amazon rainforest. Experts are continuously and commonly discussing with conservationists, policy‐makers, and local politicians and leaders about ecotourism and its impacts on surrounding ecosystems. Ecotourism can contribute to the conservation and sustainability of biodiversity in rainforests.

Amazon rainforest 
One of the world's largest and most dense rainforests is the Amazon rainforest in South America. Rainforests are disappearing across the world, and at an alarming rate in Brazil. Since the 1980s, more than 153,000 square miles of Amazonian rainforest has fallen victim to deforestation. Brazil has helped feed the growing global demand for food supply of soybeans and beef with the newly cleared land. The Amazon easily makes up one of the world’s biggest and most biodiverse ecological reserves, once lush, think, highly diverse basin, that has now been cleared in many areas for soy fields and cattle ranches. Recently, Brazil has worked to immensely slow the destruction of its rainforests, reducing the rate of deforestation by over 80%.

Deforestation has to some degree been slowed down by implementing stricter land use regulations and creating protected areas. Greenhouse gas emissions, which are largely due to the alarming rates of rainforest destruction, are one of the largest contributors to climate change in the Amazon region. The national government of Brazil aids better social and economic planning of specific areas with significant similarities with national policies. In 2009 alone, Brazil acknowledged an issue and accepted the challenge presented to reduce its carbon emissions by 36–38 percent by 2020 in efforts to in turn reduce the amounts of gases being emitted into the air.

Carbon credits 
Another way conservation has become the most economically beneficial option is through carbon credits. Under the Kyoto Protocol, countries must reduce their emissions of carbon dioxide by 5% below the 1990 levels before 2012.  Countries can meet their mandatory cuts in emissions by offsetting some of those emissions some other way. Through conservation or reforestation of the rainforest, countries can receive credits.

Some worldwide companies have stated publicly that they refuse to purchase products that originate from recently cleared areas of the rainforest. Beef commonly comes from farms that are located on land previously inhabited by rainforests.

It is important to conserve the rainforest because many resources for things we use everyday come from the rainforest, including rubber for tires and spices such as cinnamon and many other common items. It is imperative to life on earth that the rainforest be conserved, as the trees take in carbon dioxide to provide oxygen. About a quarter of the world's greenhouse gas emissions come from deforestation and destruction of rainforests.

See also
Sustainability
Environmental economics
Global drying
Tropical and subtropical moist broadleaf forests

References

Further reading

Tropical rainforests
Forest conservation